Taaffe can refer to:

Viscount Taaffe (title and family)
Theobald Taaffe, 1st Earl of Carlingford (died 1677), Irish-born courtier and soldier in England
Francis Taaffe, 3rd Earl of Carlingford (died 1704), Irish-born courtier and soldier in Lorraine
Nicholas Taaffe, 6th Viscount Taaffe (1685–1769), Irish-born courtier and soldier in Lorraine and Austria
Eduard Taaffe, 11th Viscount Taaffe (1833–1895), Prime Minister of Austria 1868–1870 and 1879–1893
 (1921-2001), American geographer
Henry Taaffe, 12th Viscount Taaffe (1872–1928), last Viscount Taaffe
Charlie Taaffe (1950–2019), American football coach
Denis Taaffe (died 1813), Irish political writer, pseudonym Julius Vindex
Éamonn Taaffe (born 1975), Irish sportsperson
Ellen Taaffe Zwilich (born 1939), American composer
Peter Taaffe (born 1942), British politician
Philip Taaffe (born 1937), American artist
Sonya Taaffe, American writer
Tom Taaffe, Irish horse trainer
Richard Taaffe, gemmologist and discoverer of taaffeite
Taaffe O'Connell, American actress
Olivia Taaffe, founder of St Joseph's Young Priests Society
Emily Taaffe (b. 1984), Irish actress